Jiří Šlégr (born 30 May 1971) is a Czech former professional ice hockey defenceman, and was a member of the 2001–02 Detroit Red Wings Stanley Cup championship team after being acquired in a late-season trade. Šlégr was inducted into the Czech Ice Hockey Hall of Fame on December 12, 2019.

In 2010, Šlégr, a candidate of the Czech Social Democratic Party, was elected into the Chamber of Deputies of the Parliament of the Czech Republic.

Playing career
Šlégr was drafted 23rd overall by the Vancouver Canucks in the 1990 NHL Entry Draft. Šlégr played parts of three seasons with the Canucks, before being traded to the Edmonton Oilers for Roman Oksiuta, where he played for parts of two seasons. He spent the 1996–97 season playing in Södertälje SK in Sweden. He then returned to the NHL, where he had been traded to the Pittsburgh Penguins for a 3rd round draft pick, and played three and a half seasons there, wearing number 71 that would later be more associated with Evgeni Malkin. In January 2001, he was traded to the Atlanta Thrashers for a 3rd round draft pick. Atlanta traded Šlégr to the Detroit Red Wings for Yuri Butsayev and a 3rd round draft pick in March 2002 and won the Stanley Cup with the Red Wings that season.

He signed as a free agent with Vancouver in September 2003, but was traded to the Boston Bruins in January 2004 for a conditional pick after falling out of favor with Vancouver Canucks coach Marc Crawford. Šlégr spent the 2004–05 NHL lockout season with HC Litvínov in the Czech Republic before returning to the Boston Bruins for the 2005–06 season.  After leaving the NHL, Šlégr returned to the Czech Republic to play for HC Litvínov, and for EHC Biel of the NLA during the 2007 playoffs.

International play

Šlégr won a gold medal in the 2005 World Championships and 1998 Olympics for the Czech Republic, and a bronze medal in the 1992 Olympics for Czechoslovakia.  Along with the Stanley Cup he won with the Detroit Red Wings in 2002, Šlégr won all three major trophies in ice-hockey, gaining entry to the prestigious Triple Gold Club.

Political career
In the 2010 elections, Šlégr was elected into the Chamber of Deputies as a candidate of the Czech Social Democratic Party in the Ústecký kraj, a region in northern Bohemia. Although the Social Democrats won the elections, they found themselves isolated and a right-wing government led by Petr Nečas was formed instead, forcing the Social Democratic Chairman, Jiří Paroubek, to resign. 
Šlégr, loyal to Paroubek, followed the former chairman in 2011 when he left the Social Democrats and founded a new party, the National Socialists – 21st Century Left. Since he had refused to resign, Šlégr remained in the Parliament as an unaffiliated MP.

Šlégr announced on June 14, 2013 that he was "going back to the clean environment among athletes" and stepped down from his position.

Personal life
He is the estranged son of former Vancouver Canucks defenceman Jiří Bubla. He legally changed his surname from Bubla to his stepfather's surname of Šlégr as a child.

Šlégr was married 15 years with Kateřina Šlégrová. The couple split in November 2010 and divorced in February 2013. Šlégr married Lucie Králová in May, 2015.

Career statistics

Regular season and playoffs

International

See also
Notable families in the NHL

References

External links 

 

1971 births
Living people
Atlanta Thrashers players
Avangard Omsk players
Boston Bruins players
Cape Breton Oilers players
Czech ice hockey defencemen
Czech Social Democratic Party MPs
Czechoslovak ice hockey defencemen
Detroit Red Wings players
Edmonton Oilers players
Hamilton Canucks players
HC Litvínov players
Ice hockey players at the 1992 Winter Olympics
Ice hockey players at the 1998 Winter Olympics
Medalists at the 1992 Winter Olympics
Medalists at the 1998 Winter Olympics
Olympic bronze medalists for Czechoslovakia
Olympic gold medalists for the Czech Republic
Olympic ice hockey players of Czechoslovakia
Olympic ice hockey players of the Czech Republic
Olympic medalists in ice hockey
Sportspeople from Jihlava
Pittsburgh Penguins players
Södertälje SK players
Stanley Cup champions
Triple Gold Club
Vancouver Canucks draft picks
Vancouver Canucks players
Members of the Chamber of Deputies of the Czech Republic (2010–2013)
Czech sportsperson-politicians
Czech expatriate ice hockey players in Canada
Czech expatriate ice hockey players in the United States
Czech expatriate ice hockey players in Switzerland
Czech expatriate ice hockey players in Sweden
Czech expatriate ice hockey players in Russia